Pingluo County (Xiao'erjing: پِئٍ‌لُوَ ثِيًا) is a county under the administration of the prefecture-level city of Shizuishan in the north of the Ningxia Hui Autonomous Region of the People's Republic of China. bordering Inner Mongolia to the northwest and east.

Characteristics

Situated on the shore of the Yellow River basin, Pingluo County is a well-known agricultural county. Although large and widespread areas of the county consist of low-lying swamps with high salt and alkali content that remain uncultivated, residents still use high-tech methods to undertake agriculture. Today, wheat is the primary crop, because the long sunlight hours in the county are conducive to its cultivation. The county's postal code is 753400.

Administrative divisions
Pingluo County has 7 towns and 3 townships.
7 towns
 Chengguan
 Taole
 Chonggang
 Yaofu
 Touzha
 Baofeng
 Huangquqiao

3 townships
 Tongfu
 Qukou
 Lingsha

Climate

References

County-level divisions of Ningxia
Shizuishan